Siku is the pseudonym of British/Nigerian artist and writer Ajibayo Akinsiku, best known for his work in 2000 AD.

Biography
Siku studied design and printing at the Yaba's School of Art, and theology at the London School of Theology.

Siku's fully painted work (particularly on Judge Dredd and the Pan-African Judges stories) has been appearing in 2000 AD and the Judge Dredd Megazine since 1991.

Siku also works in the computer games industry and as a conceptualist and freelance concept artist.

His latest work is The Manga Bible: From Genesis to Revelation, an adaptation of Today's New International Version of the Holy Bible into manga format.

Siku is also a theologian. His latest book, Batman is Jesus, is a radical narrative theological perspective of the life and work of Jesus Christ.

Bibliography
Comics work includes:

Anderson: Psi Division: "Reasons to Be Cheerful" (with Alan Grant, in Judge Dredd Megazine (vol. 2) No. 11, 1992)
Judge Hershey: "Asylum" (with Robbie Morrison, in Judge Dredd Megazine (vol. 2) #25–26, 1993)
One-Off: "Rapid Growth" (with Chris Standley, in Judge Dredd Megazine (vol. 2) No. 35, 1993)
Pan-African Judges:
 "Pan-African Judges" (with Paul Cornell, in Judge Dredd Megazine (vol. 2) #44–49, 1993–1994)
 "Fever of the Gods" (script and art, in Judge Dredd Megazine (vol. 3) #6–13, 1995–1996)
Judge Dredd:
 "The Strange Case of Bill Clinton" (with John Wagner, in Judge Dredd Megazine (vol. 2) No. 72, 1995)
 "Whatever Happened to Bill Clinton?" (with John Wagner, in Judge Dredd Megazine (vol. 2) No. 81, 1995)
 "Fetish" (with John Smith, in Judge Dredd Megazine (vol. 3) #26–30, 1997)
 "The Bouncey Brat Heist" (with John Wagner, in Judge Dredd Megazine (vol. 3) No. 42, June 1998)
 "When the El Breaks" (with John Wagner, in 2000 AD #1099, June 1998)
 "Vidspex" (with John Wagner, in Judge Dredd Megazine (vol. 3) No. 44, August 1998)
 "Revenge of Trapper Hag" (with John Wagner, in 2000 AD #1165–1166, October 1999)
 "Shakespeare at War" (with Alan Grant, in 2000 AD #1174, January 2000)
 "Pumpkin Eater" (with Alan Grant, in 2000 AD #1180–1182, February–March 2000)
 "Cube Life" (with John Wagner, in 2000 AD #1203, July 2000)
 "Someone in the House" (with John Wagner, in 2000 AD #1205, August 2000)
 "Kicking the Habit" (with John Wagner, in 2000 AD #1243, May 2001)
 "A Tree Grows in Elia Kazan" (with John Wagner, in 2000 AD No. 302, July 2002)
 "Meatmonger " (with John Smith, in 2000 AD #1365–1370, November–December 2003)
Harlem Heroes: "Cyborg Death Trip" (inks, with writer Michael Fleisher and pencils by Kev Hopgood in 2000 AD #933–939, 1995)
Witch World: "The Dark Man" (with Gordon Rennie, in 2000 AD #1050–52, 1997)
Sinister Dexter (with Dan Abnett):
 "The Mating Game" (in 2000 AD #1066, 1997)
 "Whack the Dinosaur" (in 2000 AD #1075, 1997)
 "Dressed to Kill" (in 2000 AD #1078, 1998)
 "Suddenly, Genghis" (in 2000 AD #1271, 2001)
Sláine: "The Swan Children" (with Pat Mills, in 2000 AD # 1112–1114, 1998)
Downlode Tales: "Syn City" (with Dan Abnett in 2000 AD #1127, 1999)
Pulp Sci-Fi:
 "Female of the Species" (with Robbie Morrison, in 2000 AD #1149, 1999)
 "Chronvicts" (with Gordon Rennie, in 2000 AD #1172, 1999)
Tharg's Future Shocks: "Space Dust" (with Andrew Ness, in 2000 AD #1190, 2000)
Tales of Telguuth (with Steve Moore):
 "Music of the Spheres" (in 2000 AD #1193, 2000)
 "Men of Snakewood" (in 2000 AD #1197, 2000)
 "The Transfiguration of Tesro Karnik" (in 2000 AD #1227–29, 2001)
 "The Oscillations of Taramasellion" (in 2000 AD #1235–36, 2001)
 "The Hunting of the Veks" (in 2000 AD #1249, 2001)
 "The Vileness of Scromyx" (in 2000 AD #1258–1260, 2001)
 "The Infinite Return of Varkor Gan" (in 2000 AD # 1263, 2001)
 "The Atrocities of Pagafruuz Jeel" (in 2000 AD #1283, 2001)
Kane & Abel (in Front magazine, 2003)
Far From Faith: Orions Becoming #1 (by Brambletyne Productions, 2006)
The Manga Bible: Extreme (2007, Hodder & Stoughton)
The Manga Bible: From Genesis to Revelation (2008, Galilee Trade)

Notes

References

 Siku at Barney

External links
 
 Siku images on the Folio illustration agency website

Interviews

 2004 interview with 2000ADReview
 Interview at 3D art website
 Videogame Diary interview

Nigerian comics artists
English people of Nigerian descent
Living people
English people of Yoruba descent
Yoruba artists
Yaba College of Technology alumni
Year of birth missing (living people)